Sir Donald Charles Cameron (12 May 1877 – 8 October 1962) was a Dunedin businessman and was Mayor of Dunedin from 1944 to 1950. He was knighted in the 1948 Birthday Honours and received the freedom of the City of Edinburgh in 1949.

Personal life
He was born in Dunedin, and married Frances Raines in 1905.

Career
In 44 years with Reid and Gray he rose from office boy to director. He was on the Dunedin City Council since 1935. He was connected with the Methodist Central Mission for 55 years, and was president of the Methodist Conference of New Zealand in 1926. He was president of the Otago Centenary Association in 1948, chairman of the Armed Forces Appeal Board and on the Otago Education Board and Otago University Council.

In the 1948 King's Birthday Honours, Cameron was appointed a Knight Bachelor.

References

1877 births
1962 deaths
New Zealand businesspeople
Deputy mayors of places in New Zealand
Mayors of Dunedin
New Zealand Methodists
New Zealand Knights Bachelor
Dunedin City Councillors
Unsuccessful candidates in the 1951 New Zealand general election
Unsuccessful candidates in the 1935 New Zealand general election
Unsuccessful candidates in the 1931 New Zealand general election
Reform Party (New Zealand) politicians
New Zealand National Party politicians